The 1941 Queensland state election was held on 29 March 1941.

By-elections
 On 27 May 1939, Arthur Jones (Labor) was elected to succeed William Wellington (Labor), who had died on 2 March, as the member for Charters Towers.
 On 27 May 1939, Charles Brown (Independent) was elected to succeed George Pollock (Labor), who had died on 24 March, as the member for Gregory.
 On 27 May 1939, George Keyatta (Labor) was elected to succeed Maurice Hynes (Labor), who had died on 27 March, as the member for Townsville.
 On 9 November 1940, Bill Moore (Labor) was elected to succeed James Keogh (Labor), who had died on 31 August 1940, as the member for Merthyr.
 On 9 November 1940, Stephen Theodore (Labor) was elected to succeed Percy Pease (Labor), who had died on 17 September 1940, as the member for Herbert.

Retiring Members

Labor
John Mullan MLA (Carpentaria)

Country
Arthur Moore MLA (Aubigny)

Candidates
Sitting members at the time of the election are shown in bold text.

See also
 1941 Queensland state election
 Members of the Queensland Legislative Assembly, 1938–1941
 Members of the Queensland Legislative Assembly, 1941–1944
 List of political parties in Australia

References
 

Candidates for Queensland state elections